Two ships of the United States Navy have been named USS Santa Fe, after the city of Santa Fe, New Mexico.

 The first  was a light cruiser that saw much action in the Pacific during World War II.
 The second  is a  nuclear attack submarine commissioned in 1994.

Santa Fe, New Mexico
United States Navy ship names